The Grammy Award for Best Gospel Album is an honor presented at the Grammy Awards, a ceremony that was established in 1958 and originally called the Gramophone Awards, to recording artists for quality albums in the Gospel music genre. Honors in several categories are presented at the ceremony annually by the National Academy of Recording Arts and Sciences of the United States to "honor artistic achievement, technical proficiency and overall excellence in the recording industry, without regard to album sales or chart position".

The Best Gospel Album award was one of the new categories created after a major overhaul of the Grammy Awards categories for 2012. This award combines recordings that were previously submitted for the Best Contemporary R&B Gospel Album, Best Rock or Rap Gospel Album and Best Traditional Gospel Album.

The Recording Academy decided to make a distinction between Contemporary Christian Music (CCM) and Gospel music after determining that there were "two distinct wings to the gospel house: Contemporary Christian Music (CCM) and Urban or Soul Gospel. Additionally, it was determined that the word "Gospel" tends to conjure up the images and sounds of traditional soul gospel and not CCM. With this in mind, it was decided not only to rename each of the categories, but also the entire [genre] field. [It] was determined that album and songwriting categories are of highest importance; Gospel and CCM each now have one category for each". As a result, the previous gospel album categories were combined into the Best Gospel Album (for soul and urban contemporary gospel music) and Best Contemporary Christian Music Album categories.

Recipients

 Each year is linked to the article about the Grammy Awards held that year.

See also
Grammy Award for Best Gospel/Contemporary Christian Music Performance
Grammy Award for Best Gospel Song

References

External links
Official site of the Grammy Awards

 
Awards established in 2012
Gospel Album
Gospel Album
Album awards